Proxenus mindara, the rough-skinned cutworm moth, is a species of cutworm or dart moth in the family Noctuidae. It was first described by William Barnes and James Halliday McDunnough in 1913 and it is found in North America.

The MONA or Hodges number for Proxenus mindara is 9648.

References

Further reading

 
 
 

Caradrinini
Articles created by Qbugbot
Moths described in 1913